Owambarctia is a genus of moths in the family Erebidae.

Species
 Owambarctia owamboensis Kiriakoff, 1957
 Owambarctia unipuncta Kiriakoff, 1973

References

Natural History Museum Lepidoptera generic names catalog

Syntomini
Moth genera